The Africa Zone was the unique zone within Group 3 of the regional Davis Cup competition in 2017. The zone's competition was held in round robin format in Cairo, Egypt, from 17 July to 22 July 2017. The two winning nations won promotion to Group II, Europe/Africa Zone, for 2018.

Participating nations

Inactive nations

Draw
Date: 17–22 July

Location: Solaimaneyah Club, Cairo, Egypt (clay)

Format: Round-robin basis. Two pools of four and five teams, respectively (Pools A and B). The winner of each pool plays off against the runner-up of the other pool to determine which two nations are promoted to Asia/Oceania Zone Group II in 2018.

Seeding: The seeding was based on the Davis Cup Rankings of 10 April 2017 (shown in parentheses below).

Pool A 

Standings are determined by: 1. number of wins; 2. number of matches; 3. in two-team ties, head-to-head records; 4. in three-team ties, (a) percentage of sets won (head-to-head records if two teams remain tied), then (b) percentage of games won (head-to-head records if two teams remain tied), then (c) Davis Cup rankings.

Pool B 

{{5TeamRR-TennisWide
| title-1= 
| title-2=RR W–L
| title-3=Set W–L
| title-4=Game W–L
| title-5=Standings

| seed-3=81
| team-3-abbrev=ALG
| team-3=
| match-w/l-3=2–2
| set-w/l-3=17–9 (65%)
| game-w/l-3=134–86 (61%)
| standings-3=3

| seed-2=83
| team-2-abbrev=BEN
| team-2=
| match-w/l-2=3–1
| set-w/l-2=
| game-w/l-2=
| standings-2=2

| seed-1=117
| team-1-abbrev=KEN
| team-1=
| match-w/l-1=4–0
| set-w/l-1=20–7 (74%)
| game-w/l-1=
| standings-1=1

| seed-5=119
| team-5-abbrev=BOT
| team-5=
| match-w/l-5=0–4
| set-w/l-5=4–23 (15%)
| game-w/l-5=67–149 (31%)
| standings-5=5

| seed-4=129
| team-4-abbrev=LBA
| team-4=
| match-w/l-4=1–3
| set-w/l-4=7–20 (26%)
| game-w/l-4=83–151 (35%)
| standings-4=4

|color-row-3= |          3v4=3–0 |3v2=1–2 |3v5=3–0 |3v1=1–2
|color-row-2= |2v1=1–2 |          2v4=3–0 |2v5=3–0 |2v3=2–1|color-row-4= |4v1=1–2 |4v2=0–3 |          4v5=2–1 |4v3=0–3
|color-row-5= |5v1=0–3 |5v2=0–3 |5v4=1–2           |5v3=0–3
|color-row-1= |1v3=2–1 |1v4=2–1 |1v2=2–1 |1v5=3–0
}}
Standings are determined by: 1. number of wins; 2. number of matches; 3. in two-team ties, head-to-head records; 4. in three-team ties, (a) percentage of sets won (head-to-head records if two teams remain tied), then (b) percentage of games won (head-to-head records if two teams remain tied), then (c) Davis Cup rankings.

 Playoffs 

  and ''' promoted to Group II in 2018.

Round robin

Pool A

Zimbabwe vs. Rwanda

Egypt vs. Nigeria

Zimbabwe vs. Nigeria

Egypt vs. Rwanda

Zimbabwe vs. Egypt

Nigeria vs. Rwanda

Pool B

Benin vs. Libya

Kenya vs. Botswana

Algeria vs. Kenya

Botswana vs. Libya

Algeria vs. Botswana

Benin vs. Kenya

Algeria vs. Libya

Benin vs. Botswana

Algeria vs. Benin

Kenya vs. Libya

Playoffs

Promotional playoffs

Egypt vs. Benin

Zimbabwe vs. Kenya

Fifth place playoff

Nigeria vs. Algeria

Seventh place playoff

Rwanda vs. Libya

References

External links
Official Website

Africa Zone Group III
Davis Cup Europe/Africa Zone